{{DISPLAYTITLE:C24H31N3O2}}
The molecular formula C24H31N3O2 (molar mass: 393.52 g/mol, exact mass: 393.2416 u) may refer to:

 Adamantyl-THPINACA
 1B-LSD
 1P-ETH-LAD